Joy is a small lunar impact crater located in the irregular ground just to the west of Mare Serenitatis. It is a circular, cup-shaped feature with a slightly raised rim.

The crater was named after American astronomer Alfred Harrison Joy in 1973. Before, it was designated Hadley A. Mons Hadley lies to the west-northwest in the Montes Apenninus range.

References

External links

 LTO-41B3 Joy — L&PI topographic map of crater and vicinity

Impact craters on the Moon